Christopher Paul Lewis (August 1, 1944 – January 28, 2021) was an American writer and film producer, primarily for television, also known for his involvement in a child pornography scandal in 1973.

Family
Christopher Lewis was the elder son of Hollywood actress Loretta Young and Hollywood producer Tom Lewis. His younger brother is Peter Lewis, one of the founding members of the seminal 1960s rock band Moby Grape. Christopher and Peter Lewis were the half-brothers of actress Judy Lewis (1935–2011), daughter of Loretta Young and Clark Gable. Their aunts were the actresses Polly Ann Young and Sally Blane, who were sisters of Loretta Young. Musician David Lindley is their cousin.
Blane was the second wife of actor and director Norman Foster, who was an uncle of Lewis. Actress Georgiana Young was a half-sister of his mother, and she was married to actor Ricardo Montalbán, making him a half-nephew of both of them.

Lyric Productions and child pornography scandal

In 1973 Christopher Lewis, then 29, was involved in a child pornography filmmaking scandal while working as a filmmaker for the motion picture company known as Lyric Productions. The company was founded by Humble Oil heir Billy Byars Jr. in association with the distribution company DOM-Lyric, founded by noted producer and distributor of "chicken gay films" (movies portraying sex acts by young boys) Guy Strait, who at one point was described as "one of the largest producers and distributors of homosexual films involving youths in the West". Lewis, along with 13 other men, were charged with child molestation and filming and distributing child pornography, being indicted with soliciting boys ranging from ages 6 to 17 to perform lewd acts in their movies. 
In April of that year Lewis pleaded "no contest" to the child molestation charges, which meant he was considered guilty of that charge. Potentially facing a sentence of up to life in prison, in June of that same year he was sentenced to probation and a $500 fine.

Film career
Christopher Lewis continued as a writer and producer of films primarily for television, through The Entertainment Group, a company co-owned with his wife, Linda G. Corkran. Christopher Lewis was also a producer of horror films, including Blood Cult (1985), one of the earliest direct-to-video releases and the first to turn a significant profit.

In later years, Christopher Lewis' actress mother entrusted her son with the rights to The Loretta Young Show. He and his wife thereafter became co-producers of contemporary television broadcasts of the show, which have also been released on DVD.

Death
Christopher Lewis passed away on January 28, 2021, of heart issues, while wintering in Florida with his wife.

References

External links

1944 births
2021 deaths
American male screenwriters